Kate Spencer may refer to:

 Kate Spencer (author)
 Katie Spencer (curler)
 Manhunter (Kate Spencer)